is a multipurpose athletic stadium in Hitachinaka, Ibaraki, Japan opened in 1978. The stadium has a nine-line athletic track surrounding a soccer field, and was the home stadium for the Mito HollyHock from 1998 to 2009.

Gallery

External links

Football venues in Japan
Sports venues in Ibaraki Prefecture
Hitachinaka, Ibaraki
Mito HollyHock